José Juan "JJ" Macías Guzmán (born 22 September 1999) is a Mexican professional footballer who plays as a forward for Liga MX club Guadalajara.

Club career

Guadalajara
In 2011, Macías joined C.D. Guadalajara's youth academy. Six years later, now aged 17, coach Matías Almeyda called up Macías to form part of the first team. On 16 July, he made his official debut in the 2017 Campeón de Campeones match against Tigres UANL. Six days later, he made his league debut against Toluca in a scoreless draw. On 8 August, Macías scored his first professional goal for Guadalajara in a Copa MX match against Juárez. On 28 October, he scored his first brace against Tijuana in a 3–1 home win.

In December, it was confirmed that Macías would return to Guadalajara, with León stating that it was the player's decision. On 11 January 2020, he played his first match with Guadalajara since his loan stint against Juárez, and scored in the team's 2–0 win.

Prior to the start of the 2020–21 season, Guadalajara participated in the friendly preseason tournament 2020 Copa por México. In the semi-final match against rivals Club América, Macías scored within 19 seconds of the start, marking it as the fastest goal in a Súper Clásico as Guadalajara won 4–3. He finished as the top scorer of the tournament with four goals but did not participate in the final against Cruz Azul due to injury, where the Guadalajara finished as runner-ups.

León (loan)
In December 2018, Macías joined Club León on a year-long loan deal with an option to buy. He scored his first brace against Querétaro in a 4–0 away victory. He scored eight goals during the regular phase of the 2019 Clausura, making him the top-scoring Mexican player in the tournament at only 19 years old. Macías scored another two goals in the championship stage to take his total goal tally to ten as León progressed to the finals. He missed the finals against Tigres UANL due to receiving a call-up to play with the Mexico national under-20 team at the World Cup in Poland. He was listed on the Best XI of the 2019 Clausura.

He finished the 2019 Apertura with eight goals under his name.

Getafe (loan)
On 5 July 2021, Macías joined La Liga club Getafe on a season-long loan, with an option of purchase. He featured in eight matches overall for the side before having his loan terminated on 31 January 2022.

Return to Guadalajara
On 30 June 2022, Macías suffered a major knee injury. He was sidelined for the rest of the year. On 16 February 2023, Macías suffered a new knee injury. He underwent surgery the next day and is expected to be out of action between eight and nine months.

International career

Youth
On 25 October 2018, Macías was called up by Diego Ramírez to participate in the 2018 CONCACAF U-20 Championship. He scored 10 goals in the tournament, including 4 against Aruba, winning him the Golden Boot of the tournament. As Mexico would finish runner-up in the tournament, he was listed in the Best XI of the tournament. In April 2019, Macías was included in the 21-player squad to represent Mexico at the U-20 World Cup in Poland.

Macías was included in the final roster that participated at the 2018 Toulon Tournament. He would go on to appear in three matches as Mexico finished runners-up.

Macías was included in the final roster that participated in the 2018 Central American and Caribbean Games. He appeared in two group stage matches as Mexico finished last in their group with one point.

Macías was called up by Jaime Lozano to participate at the 2020 CONCACAF Olympic Qualifying Championship, scoring one goal in four appearances, where Mexico won the competition. He was in the final roster for 2020 Summer Olympics but withdrew due to injury, being subsequently replaced by Adrián Mora.

Senior
On 2 October 2019, Macías earned his first cap with the senior national team in a friendly match against Trinidad and Tobago, scoring on his debut in the team's 2–0 victory. A couple of days later, he would score in both 2019–20 CONCACAF Nations League fixtures. The first against Bermuda, scoring his first brace with the national team winning 5–1, and the second against Panama, coming on as a substitute to help break a 1–1 deadlock, scoring Mexico's second goal in an eventual 3–1 victory.

Career statistics

Club

International

Scores and results list Mexico's goal tally first, score column indicates score after each Macías goal.

Honours
Guadalajara
CONCACAF Champions League: 2018

Mexico U23
CONCACAF Olympic Qualifying Championship: 2020

Individual
CONCACAF Under-20 Championship Best XI: 2018
CONCACAF Under-20 Championship Golden Boot: 2018
Liga MX Best XI: Clausura 2019

References

External links
 
 

1999 births
Living people
Footballers from Guadalajara, Jalisco
Mexican footballers
Association football forwards
Mexico youth international footballers
Mexico under-20 international footballers
Mexico international footballers
Liga MX players
C.D. Guadalajara footballers
La Liga players
Getafe CF footballers
Mexican expatriate footballers
Mexican expatriate sportspeople in Spain
Expatriate footballers in Spain